The 2013 Hamilton Nationals season is the fifth and final season for the Hamilton Nationals of Major League Lacrosse, and third since relocating from Toronto. They improved upon their 2012 season in which they finished with a record of 4-10. But lost to the Bayhawks in the semifinals

Standings

External links
 Team Website

Hamilton Nationals seasons
2013 in lacrosse
2013 in Canadian sports